Horodiște is a commune in Rezina District, Moldova. It is composed of two villages, Horodiște and Slobozia-Horodiște.

References

Communes of Rezina District